Orvinio is a  (municipality) in the Province of Rieti in the Italian region of Latium, located about  northeast of Rome and about  south of Rieti.

The ancient city of Orvinium was destroyed before the year 1000. The successor town was named “Canemortem”, or later "Canemorto", till it was changed to Orvinio in 1863. There are multiple stories as to why the name Canemorto had previously been attached to the site.

Main sights
Among the landmarks in the town are:
Santa Maria dei Raccomandati
Ruins of the Abbey of Santa Maria del Piano

References

Cities and towns in Lazio